Cambridge Historic District, Wards I and III is a national historic district in Cambridge, Dorchester County, Maryland. It is a large residential, commercial, and governmental area in the northwest section of the city.  It consists of buildings from the late 18th through the mid 20th century.  Residential building styles include Georgian, Queen Anne, Colonial Revival, and American Foursquare.  The district includes the Italian Villa style courthouse designed by Richard Upjohn.

It was added to the National Register of Historic Places in 1990.

References

External links
, including photo dated 1990, at Maryland Historical Trust
Boundary Map of the Cambridge Historic District, Wards I and III, Dorchester County, at Maryland Historical Trust

Cambridge, Maryland
Historic districts in Dorchester County, Maryland
Georgian architecture in Maryland
Queen Anne architecture in Maryland
Colonial Revival architecture in Maryland
Historic districts on the National Register of Historic Places in Maryland
National Register of Historic Places in Dorchester County, Maryland